John Hiram Harris (born May 7, 1933) is a former American football player who played with the Oakland Raiders. He played college football at Santa Monica College.

References

1933 births
Living people
American football defensive backs
Santa Monica Corsairs football players
Oakland Raiders players
Players of American football from San Antonio
American Football League players